José Carlos Barbosa Calvário (1951, Porto – 17 June 2009, Oeiras) was a Portuguese songwriter and conductor.

He was also a composer, and conducted at many Portuguese festivals.

In the Eurovision Song Contest he was the composer, lyricist and conductor of five Portuguese entries, some of them are A festa da vida (1972), E Depois do Adeus (1974),
Portugal No Coração (1977), Penso em ti, eu sei (1985) and Voltarei (1988).

Death
He died on 17 June 2009, aged 58, following a heart attack.

References

1951 births
2009 deaths
Musicians from Porto
Portuguese conductors (music)
Male conductors (music)
Portuguese songwriters
Male songwriters
Portuguese musicians
Portuguese male musicians
20th-century conductors (music)
Eurovision Song Contest conductors
20th-century male musicians